Peter Luttenberger (born 13 December 1972) is a retired Austrian professional road bicycle racer.  He finished fifth in the General classification of the 1996 Tour de France, but he never again managed to live up to the promise of that result, with a position as 13 in 1997 and 2003 as the best later results. He was born in Bad Radkersburg. He won the Austrian National Road Race Championships in 1993. He also competed at the 1992 Summer Olympics and the 1996 Summer Olympics. He won the overall at the 1996 Tour de Suisse

Major results
Source:

1993 
 1st  National Road race Championships
 1st Piccolo Giro di Lombardia
1996
 1st  Overall Tour de Suisse
1st Stage 7 
 5th Overall Tour de France
 7th Overall Euskal Bizikleta
1997
 6th Overall Tour du Limousin
1998
 1st  National Time trial Championships
 1st Stage 5 Tour of Austria
 8th Overall Volta a la Comunitat Valenciana
 8th Overall Setmana Catalana de Ciclisme
 9th Overall Paris–Nice
 9th Overall Tour de Suisse
1999
 4th Overall Vuelta a Aragón
 5th Overall Tour of the Basque Country
 10th Klasika Primavera
2000
 1st Stage 1 TTT Volta a Catalunya
 4th Subida Urkiola
 8th Overall Critérium du Dauphiné Libéré
2001
 2nd National Time trial Championships
 7th Overall Giro del Trentino
 7th Giro dell'Appennino
 10th La Flèche Wallonne
 10th Milano–Torino
 10th Klasika Primavera
2002
 3rd Overall Tour of Austria
 4th Overall Giro del Trentino
 4th Overall Settimana Internazionale di Coppi e Bartali
 7th Overall Tour de Suisse
 8th Milano–Torino
 8th Subida Urkiola
2006
 1st  National Time trial Championships

Grand Tour general classification results timeline

References

External links 
Official homepage
Profile at Team CSC

1972 births
Living people
Austrian male cyclists
Cyclists at the 1992 Summer Olympics
Cyclists at the 1996 Summer Olympics
Olympic cyclists of Austria
People from Bad Radkersburg
Tour de Suisse stage winners
Sportspeople from Styria